Selwyn Brown may refer to:

 Selwyn Brown (musician), keyboard player with Steel Pulse
 Selwyn Brown (American football) (born 1965), American football defensive back